Stigmella orientalis is a moth of the family Nepticulidae. It is only known from Kyushu in Japan.

The larvae feed on Acer species. They mine the leaves of their host plant.

References

Nepticulidae
Moths of Japan
Moths described in 1985